Loureira  is a Portuguese parish, located in the municipality of Vila Verde. The population in 2021 was 1106 in an area of 1.87 km². 

Freguesias of Vila Verde